Terminal Illness Insurance (known as Accelerated Death benefit in North America) pays out a capital sum if the policyholder is diagnosed with a terminal illness from which the policyholder is expected to die within 12 months of diagnosis, by a physician who specialises in that illness or condition. 

Terminal Illness Insurance is a form of insurance that is often added to a life insurance policy or a Mortgage Life Insurance policy by the insurance company issuing the policy. Terminal Illness Insurance is not available as a separate insurance policy. 

If a life insurance policyholder also has terminal illness insurance, then he/she has the benefit of knowing that if he/she is diagnosed with a serious illness and is expected to die within 12 months of diagnosis, then the combined policy will pay out straight away rather than waiting for the policyholder to die (as would happen if the policyholder did not have terminal illness insurance).

Do not confuse terminal illness insurance with critical illness insurance. The two forms of insurance are very different.

See also
Family income benefit insurance

Health insurance
Types of insurance